Joseph Reynolds may refer to:

Joseph Reynolds (congressman) (1785–1864), U.S. Representative from New York and brigadier general
Joseph B. Reynolds (1836–1898), Greenback member of the Wisconsin State Assembly
Joseph J. Reynolds (1822–1899), U.S. Army general in the Civil War and Black Hills War
Joseph Melvin Reynolds (1924–1997), American physicist
Joseph "Diamond Jo" Reynolds (1819–1891), American steamboat and railroad operator

See also
Joie Ray (racing driver) (Joseph Reynolds Ray, Jr., 1923–2007), American open-wheel and stock-car racer
Joseph Reynolds House, Bristol, Rhode Island
Joe Reynolds (disambiguation)
Joey Reynolds, radio host